Benzofluoranthene may refer to:

 Benzo(k)fluoranthene
 Benzo(e)fluoranthene